Ogardzki Młyn  is a settlement in the administrative district of Gmina Strzelce Krajeńskie, within Strzelce-Drezdenko County, Lubusz Voivodeship, in western Poland.

References

Villages in Strzelce-Drezdenko County